STK may refer to:
 FC ŠTK 1914 Šamorín, a Slovak football club
 Save the Kids token, a 2021 cryptocurrency pump and dump scheme
 Shoot to Kill, former name for the professional Halo team Final Boss
 SIM Application Toolkit, a part of GSM telephony standard responsible for applications stored on SIM
 Soo Teck LRT station, Punggol, Singapore (LRT station abbreviation)
 ST Kinetics, a Singapore-based arms manufacturer
 Státní technická knihovna (State Library of Technology), 1960–2009 name of the NTK (Czech National Library of Technology)
 Storage Technology Corporation (StorageTek), a data storage company acquired in 2005 by Sun Microsystems
 SuperTuxKart, an arcade racing game
 Synthesis Toolkit, a cross-platform library in C++ for sound synthesis and physical modelling
 Systems Tool Kit (formerly Satellite Tool Kit), an astrodynamics computer program from Analytical Graphics, Inc.